Alejandro Hisis Anaya (born 16 February 1962) is a retired Chilean football defender.

Career
Hisis was born in Valparaíso.  He played for several clubs in Latin America and Europe, including Colo-Colo, Club de Fútbol Monterrey and OFI Crete. He is the first Chilean to play for OFI Crete before Jaime Vera, Miguel Vargas and Felipe Gallegos.

Hisis received 41 caps for the Chile national football team, scoring twice.

References

External links
 
 
 

1962 births
Living people
Chilean people of Greek descent
Sportspeople from Valparaíso
Chilean footballers
Chilean expatriate footballers
Chile international footballers
Footballers at the 1984 Summer Olympics
Olympic footballers of Chile
1983 Copa América players
1989 Copa América players
Association football defenders
Primera C Metropolitana players
Club Comunicaciones footballers
Chilean Primera División players
Deportes Temuco footballers
Colo-Colo footballers
Club Deportivo Palestino footballers
Super League Greece players
OFI Crete F.C. players
Liga MX players
C.F. Monterrey players
Tigres UANL footballers
C.F. Pachuca players
Primera B de Chile players
Santiago Morning footballers
Expatriate footballers in Argentina
Chilean expatriate sportspeople in Argentina
Expatriate footballers in Greece
Chilean expatriate sportspeople in Greece
Expatriate footballers in Mexico
Chilean expatriate sportspeople in Mexico
Chilean football managers
Chilean expatriate football managers
Deportes Puerto Montt managers
Primera B de Chile managers
Expatriate football managers in Greece
Expatriate football managers in Mexico